Paris: XY is a 2001 film directed by Zeka Laplaine.

Plot
Max is a tailor from the Congo living in Paris who neglects his wife and children while he works long hours, then haunts the bars, flirting with lonely women.
Max wakes one morning and discovers that his wife Helen has left him while he was sleeping, without a word, taking their two children with her. 
He does not understand.  The nights stretch out.
He wrestles with his demons to find reality, probes his feeling, analyzes the artificiality of his life.
He finally rediscovers his love for Helen, but it is too late to win her back.

Production

The director, who is also the lead actor, comes from the Democratic Republic of the Congo.  This is his second feature film.  Although the protagonist is African his wife is white.
Zeka Laplaine chose to shoot the film in grainy black and white.
The film was produced with the help of the Fonds francophone de production audiovisuelle du Sud.

Reception

Le Monde said that this intimate film of daily life is one that will arouse either sympathy or irritation. 
Afrik.com said that the film delivers an equation of sad love with Paris providing a warm background.
Time Out Film Guide said that "While some of the editing's a touch clumsy, there's an air of spontaneity about the b/w camerawork".

Cast

 Sylvia Vaudano as Hélène
 Zeka Laplaine as Max
 Pilou Ioua as Paco
 Lisa Edmondson as Keba
 Anna Garfein as Elvire
 Sabine Bail as Joséphine / La vendeuse
 Kudzo Do Tobias as Kanga the doc gynéco (gynecologist)
 Victor Wagner as Le père d'Hélène (Hélène's father) 
 Moussa Sene Absa as Le voyant (the psychic)
 Hervé Husson as Hervé
 Elisabeth Landwerlin as Marie
 Sylvie Bataillard as La serveuse d'Elvire
 Emile Abossolo M'bo as Kalala Wa Kalala

References

External links

2001 films
Democratic Republic of the Congo drama films
French drama films
2000s French-language films
Films set in Paris
2000s French films